North Bengal Medical College and Hospital (NBMC&H) is located in Sushrutanagar, on the outskirts of Siliguri, West Bengal, India. It is the largest and the oldest healthcare teaching institute in North Bengal region of West Bengal, serving as a tertiary referral institute. The college has teaching programs for graduation and postgraduation. It is one of the 26 government medical colleges in West Bengal and the largest in terms of area. Patient influx is also huge .The hospital has a bed strength of approx 1,500 of which 843 are officially sanctioned and caters to a large population of 15 million in North Bengal, from the surrounding states of north east India and the neighbouring countries of Nepal, Bhutan and Bangladesh. It has a Bed Occupancy Rate (BOR) of 137%, which is highest in the state.

History
It was established in 1968 as the first medical college of North Bengal. Originally envisioned by Dr. B. C. Roy, the planning was executed by Ajit Kumar Panja, the then state health minister. Prof. Ajit Kr. Duttagupta joined as the first official principal of the college which was then known as North Bengal University Medical College. NBUMC was rechristened in August 1978 to North Bengal Medical College & Hospital and the administrative control went from North Bengal University to Govt. of West Bengal.

The first batches

 The premedical classes started on 6.11.67 in a makeshift arrangement at Jackson medical school, Jalpaiguri. 2nd to 6th batch of students undertook their premedical course at Raigunj University College. 7th batch onwards, the students started their premedical course at NBMC campus, Sushrutanagar, their own place.

 Classes for 1st-year MBBS course for 1st batch started on 18.11.68 in NBU campus. MBBS classes started in Sushrutanagar, the present site of NBMC in 1972. The first 5 batches had to migrate to SSKM hospital for their clinical lessons after passing 2nd prof. First 2 batches completed internship and housemanship there. The college got its recognition from the Medical Council of India in 1978.

Introduction of Postgraduation courses

In 2004, the institute achieved the milestone to be reckoned as the Post-graduate institute with introduction of MD/MS courses in five specialised disciplines like Anatomy, Physiology, Community Medicine, Pathology and Anesthesiology, which were recognized by the Medical Council of India in 2007. Since then more postgraduate courses were added in the fields of Forensic Medicine & Toxicology, General Medicine, General Surgery, Gynaecology & Obstetrics, Orthopaedics, Paediatrics, Ophthalmology,Radiodiagnosis, Psychiatry, Otorhinolaryngology and other subjects.

Increase of undergraduate seats

From 2013 onwards Undergraduate seats had been increased by 50, which made the annual undergraduate students intake to 150 but from the year 2017 the newly added 50 seats were slashed by the MCI on grounds of lack of infrastructure but again in the year 2018, intake was increased to 150. From 2019 intake was again increased to 200 (EWS Scheme).

Campus

North Bengal Medical College & Hospital is located in Sushrutanagar, locally known as Noukaghat, to the west of Siliguri, connected to the town by the 3rd Mahananda bridge. Sushrutanagar, Darjeeling, (situated at Thiknikata Gram Panchayet), otherwise referred to as ‘medical’ by the local people, is more or less 5 km from proper Siliguri. The nearest Railway Station is New Jalpaiguri about 11 km away and the nearest Airport is Bagdogra Airport about 9 km from the Campus

 
The North Bengal Dental College and the Nursing Training College are also located in the same campus.

Organisation and administration

Governance
The college and hospital are funded and managed by the Government of West Bengal.

Principals
Prof A K Dutta gupta 09.11.1970 to 30.11.1973
Dr. S C Laha 01.12.1973 to 11.07.1974
Dr. L K Ganguli 12.07.1974 to 31.03.1978
Dr. J N Bhadury 01.04.1978 to 03.03.1981
Dr. S K Biswas 04.03.1981 to 21.10.1982
Dr. A K Ram 22.10.1982 to 21.03.1983
Dr. J.N Bhadury 22.03.1983 to 10.12.1985
Dr. A Nandy 11.12.1985 to 14.08.1985
Dr. P K Gupta 15.08.1986 to 31.03.1987
Dr. S P Banerjee 02.04.1987 to 04.08.1988
Dr. G K Das 05.08.1988 to 10.11.1992
Dr. P K Mukherjee 11.11.1992 to 04.05.1995
Dr. A K Kar 04.05.1995 to 14.06.1995
Dr. S K Basu 14.06.1995 to 25.03.1998
Dr. B Sarkar 25.03.1998 to 27.10.1999
Dr. Dipti Basu 27.10.1999 to 07.09.2001
Dr. Udayan Ganguly 07.09.2001 to 06.09.2002
Dr. Utpal Kumar Datta 06.09.2002 to 31.03.2004
Dr. Sangita Bhattacharyya 31.03.2004 to 31.03.2006
Dr. J B Saha 31.03.2006 to 28.07.2006
Dr. Udayan Ganguly 28.07.2006 to 21.08.2009
Dr. J.B Saha 21.08.2009 to 17.01.2011
Dr. T. K. Bhattacharya 17.01.2011 to 30.06.2011
Dr. Anup Kr. Roy 04.07.2011 to 2015
Dr. Samir Ghosh Roy 2015 to 2018.
Dr. P.K. Deb (GEN) 2018 to 2021
Prof. (Dr.) Indrajit Saha (present principal)

Academics

Affiliation
The college was affiliated to the North Bengal University since its inception. Starting from the 2003 admission batch, it is formally affiliated to the newly formed West Bengal University of Health Sciences.

Admission

Entrance to the college for MBBS is on the basis of ranks achieved by the student in National Eligibility cum Entrance Test (Undergraduate) conducted by the NTA, as is the case with nearly all other medical colleges in the country by a Supreme Court order.

For postgraduate courses, one has to clear the National Eligibility cum Entrance Test (Postgraduate).

Academic programmes 

The courses offered are:

Undergraduate courses

 M.B.B.S. (Annual intake of 200 students)
 B.Sc. in Nursing
 GNM Nursing
 ANM Nursing

Post-graduate courses
 MD Anaesthesiology (11 seats)
 MD Biochemistry (4 seats)
 MD Community Medicine (3 seats)
 MD Forensic Medicine and Toxicology (2 seats)
 MD General Medicine (18 seats)
 MD Paediatrics (4 seats)
 MD Pathology (7 seats)
 MD Physiology (4 seats)
 MD Psychiatry (2 seats)
 MD Radiodiagnosis (6 seats)
 MS Anatomy (4 seats)
 MS Gynaecology and Obstetrics (9 seats)
 MS Ophthalmology (2 seats)
 MS Orthopaedics (2 seats)
 MS Oto-rhino-laryngology (2 seats)
 MS General Surgery (6 seats)
 M.Sc Nursing

Research level (super-specialization)
 Nephrology
 Cardiology
 Neurology
 Rheumatology
 Plastic and Reconstructive Surgery
 Pediatric Surgery
 Neurosurgery
 Cardiothoracic and Vascular Surgery
 Oral and Maxillofacial Surgery
 Selected by ICMR-NICED for establishment of Model Rural Health Research Unit (MRHRU).

Paramedical and technologist

 D.M.L.T - Diploma in Medical Lab Technology
 D.P.T - Diploma in Physical Medicine
 D.Dial - Diploma in Dialysis.
 D.R.D - Diploma in Radiology.
D.C.C.T-DIPLOMA IN CRITICAL CARE TECHNOLOGY

Conferences and workshops

The college hosts numerous Undergraduate & Postgraduate Conferences throughout the year.
Notable Conferences hosted/will be hosted by the institution includes-

 NUMESCON- It is the national undergraduate medical students' conference of North Bengal Medical College held in the month of March. The conference has hands-on workshops, sessions by eminent speakers of the medical fraternity and various other interactive events.
The First Numescon was in 2015 and saw participation from all over India as well as neighbouring countries as Bangladesh.
 Embarkon – an annual intra-college Undergraduate conference & workshop

Hospital services

 Emergency
 Outdoor services
 Indoor services
 Regional Blood Transfusion Centre (RBTC)
 Hybrid Critical Care Unit (HDU+CCU)
 Surgical Intensive Care Unit (SICU)
 Intensive Coronary Care Unit (ICCU)
 Neonatal Intensive Care Unit (NICU)
 Paediatric Intensive Care Unit (PICU)
 Sick Neonatal Intensive Care Unit (SNCU)
 Trauma Care Facility (Level II)
 A.R.T Centre
 V.C.T.C
 V.R.D.L
 Preventive Cardiology
 Tele-Medicine
 Counselling
 Diagnostic & Investigation
 Fair Price Medicine Shop
 Intermediate State Reference Laboratory for Multi Drug Resistance-TB
 Physiotherapy and Rehabilitation centre (under PMR department)
Pain Clinic (under PMR department)
Super speciality Block
Selected under MoHFW PMSSY scheme (phase III) for super Speciality care (along with Medical College Kolkata, Bankura Sammilani Medical College & Malda Medical College)
which would include 255 beds for super speciality care in neurosurgery, CTVS, Plastic surgery and Burn, Paediatric Surgery, Cardiology, Neurology and so forth.

Student life

Demography

Every year 200 (Initially it was started with 50 seats, increased to 100 then 150; 50 more seats increased from 2019) students graduate from the college. Besides, there are postgraduate students in various streams. Most students are from outside Siliguri and stay in the campus hostels. From the 2013 to 2014 session, it has been decided to increase the number of undergraduate (MBBS) seats by 50.

Hostels

Boys
 J.B.H. (Junior Boys Hostel) - for 1st year and 2nd-year students. (4 storied)
 N.B.H. (A.K Dutta Memorial Hostel) - for 3rd year and 4th-year students. (4 storied)
 S.B.H. (Senior Boys Hostel) - for final year students and interns
 Intern Hostel - for House staffs and Internees. The postgraduate trainees are also accommodated in the same hostel. (Near the Emergency Gate)
 P.G Boys Hostel- for post graduate students.

Girls
 L.H. (Ladies Hostel) - 2nd year and 3rd-year students and house staffs.
 K.G.H (Kadambini Ganguly memorial Girl's Hostel) - for 4th year, final year students, interns and house staffs.
 N.G.H. (New Girls Hostel) - for 1st-year students.
 P.G Girls hostel - for post graduate students.

Associations
 NBMC ex-students association

Cultural programmes

 The annual inter-college fest Plasma spanning 4 days is held in the month of September. It is a big event with noted artists performing and students displaying their creative fervour. Other than NBMC students, Plasma also sees active participation by students from nearby colleges like North Bengal Dental College, Siliguri Institute of Technology, North Bengal University, Jalpaiguri Government Engineering College.
 Ujan (উজান) - This is a popular Cultural Forum formed by the Medical, Dental and Paramedical students of this institution. "নবচেতনা"(Nabachetana) is the official magazine of Ujan.
 Students also celebrate Martyrs' day of Saheed-e-Azam Bhagat Singh, Mastarda Surya Sen, Khudiram Bose and birthday of Netaji, Dr Norman Bethune every year.
 The ex-students re-union Nostalgia is held in the post weekend of 18 November o every year for two days in a row.
 The freshers' welcome takes place every year to greet the new batch of MBBS students.
 Students celebrate Saraswati Puja every year in traditional style.
 Rabindra Jayanti is another annual event marking the birthday anniversary of Rabindranath Tagore.
 The college Foundation Day is observed every year on 18 November.
 College also organises Grand Iftar, during Ramadan.
 Students also celebrates Kali Puja, During Diwali, Which is a unique event.

The college students have formed their own bands. Umami, Whistling Woods, Intoxication, Doctors Chamber, Intravenous, Phonation and The Autonomous are the most famous in the campus.
2017, the Golden Jubilee year Plasma, was celebrated with the welcome of eminent band like Fossils.

See also 
 List of institutions of higher education in West Bengal

References

Refer New Super-Specialty Hospital To Be Handed Over To NBMCH | Siliguri Times | Siliguri News Updates

Rs 150cr to NBMCH for super-speciality status - Hospital to use the funds to improve infrastructure and introduce new types of surgery

NBMCH plan for new units

External links
 NBMC Ex Students Association

Medical colleges in West Bengal
Universities and colleges in Darjeeling district
Affiliates of West Bengal University of Health Sciences
Education in Siliguri
Educational institutions established in 1968
1968 establishments in West Bengal